Atheists with surnames starting T, U, V, W, X, Y or Z, sortable by the field for which they are mainly known and nationality.

Notes and references

surnames T to Z